The Houston Cougars baseball team is the college baseball team of the University of Houston. Along with the university's other athletic teams, the baseball team is a member of the American Athletic Conference as a Division I team. They play their home games at Schroeder Park. In addition to numerous NCAA Tournament appearances, the Cougars have made two College World Series appearances. Houston has been led by head coach Todd Whitting since 2011.

History

Early years and Lovette Hill era

The University of Houston's baseball program started in 1947. Head coach Ned Thompson was hired from Pasadena High School, and became the first baseball coach for 1947, backfield coach in football from 1946 to 1948 for the University of Houston. He also served as associate athletic director in charge of business finances from 1946 to 1976. Among the players for his 1947 baseball team was pitcher Bill Henry who had been a forward on Thompson's state high school championship basketball team the year prior. Following his 1947 efforts for Houston, Henry went on to become Houston's first player to play Major League Baseball, where he enjoyed a 17-year career.

During the first few years of the baseball team's existence, head coaches came and went, and after the third season, the team had already been through three. Houston's fourth head baseball coach, Lovette Hill broke this trend when taking over for the 1950 season. A year after Hill became coach, the Houston Cougars appeared in their first NCAA Regional. The 1953 season was one of the team's most historic and winningest years as they made their first College World Series appearance. Continuing with Lovette Hill, the Cougars appeared in several more NCAA Regionals throughout the 1950s and 1960s. Appearing in the 1967 College World Series against the Arizona State Sun Devils, the Cougars won runner-up and finished with a #2 national ranking. The team began by playing their home games at nearby Buffalo Stadium, before moving into an on-campus facility.

Walton era
After a 24-year tenure with the Cougars, Lovette Hill retired, and Rolan Walton took over as head coach. Walton had previously served with the Cougars in the early years under Hill as a player. He later played as a shortstop for the Victoria Rosebuds, a Texas League team, before leaving in 1954. During Walton's time as coach, the Cougars appeared in two more NCAA Regionals throughout the 1980s. Also during this time, the University of Houston discontinued their stint as being independent from any college athletic conference, and joined the now defunct Southwest Conference in 1976.

Stockton era
In 1987, the University of Houston hired Bragg Stockton as head coach, and appeared in another NCAA Regional the same year. Before Stockton retired after the 1993 season, the Cougars made one more appearance. Playing under Stockton were several standout players including Rayner Noble. After a brief stint of playing in Minor League Baseball, Noble returned to the University of Houston as an assistant coach under Stockton. In 1994, following Bragg Stockton's retirement, Rayner Noble was named head coach of the Cougars. Stockton however, was not completely done with the team, and returned for the 2002 season as a volunteer coach. Working with Noble for only a year, Stockton died.

Noble era

After becoming head coach of the Cougars in 1994, Rayner Noble launched the Cougars to more NCAA Regional appearances than any other coach in the team's history. In addition to eight of such appearances, the Cougars have appeared in three NCAA Super Regionals. In 1995, the Cougars baseball team received a newly constructed Cougar Field that seated 5,000. The following year was the last for the Southwest Conference, and in 1997 the Cougars joined Conference USA. In 2004, the Cougars played San Diego State at Petco Park in front of 40,106, the largest college baseball crowd to date.

In 2006, pitcher Brad Lincoln won the Dick Howser Trophy. Lincoln was the first to receive this award in the program's history, and in Conference USA. He also received the Brooks Wallace Award that year among other honors.

In Conference USA, the Cougars appeared in every Conference USA baseball tournament, and held the second most number of tournament titles (behind Tulane).

Despite becoming the program's winningest coach, Noble's 2009 and 2010 records were back-to-back losing seasons, which Houston had not seen since 1974 and 1975.

Whitting and modern era
In 2010, it was announced that Rayner Noble would not return as Houston's head coach. Former assistant coach and player for Houston Todd Whitting was announced as his replacement. Whitting had served in various positions with TCU, ultimately serving as associate head coach before returning to his alma mater.

In the 2013 season after rebuilding the team for two years, Whitting has led the Houston Cougar Baseball team to its best start in the last 24 seasons. In March 2013, for the first time in seven years, with Todd Whitting at the helm, Houston Cougar Baseball was ranked in the top twenty by Baseball America.

Houston's Cougar Field (now Schroeder Park) received substantial renovations at the end of the 2013 calendar year thanks to major donations from Alumni and former players. FieldTurf was installed to replace the natural grass and bullpens were upgraded giving the stadium a nice makeover.

In 2014 season, the Houston Cougars joined the American Athletic Conference for its inaugural season. Riding the momentum of the 2013 season, the Cougars continued their success into 2014 and won the AAC conference tournament to become the first American Athletic Conference Baseball Champions. The Cougars finished the 2014 regular season with an impressive 44–15 record and ranking as high as number 9 nationally. This was also the first season since 1993 the Cougars have swept baseball powerhouse Rice and claimed the Silver Glove Series.

Conference affiliations
 Independent (1947)
 Lone Star Conference (1948)
 Independent (1949)
 Gulf Coast Conference (1950)
 Missouri Valley Conference (1951–1960)
 Independent (1961–1972)
 Southwest Conference (1973–1996)
 Conference USA (1997–2013)
 American Athletic Conference (2014–2023)
 Big 12 Conference (2024–onward)

Championships

Conference Regular Season championships
The Cougars have won 11 conference regular season championships in their history, 10 of which were outright championships. In 1947, 1949, and from 1961 to 1972, the Cougars were not eligible for a conference championship as they were not affiliated with any conference.

† co-champions

Conference Tournament Finals appearances
Houston has appeared in 21 conference tournament finals in their history, winning 8 of them.

Head coaches

Notes: Through 2022 season.

NCAA Division I Baseball Championship results
The NCAA Division I Baseball Championship started in 1947.
The format of the tournament has changed throughout the years.

Rivalries
Each year Houston competes in the Silver Glove series against the Rice University Owls.

Individual Awards

National Player award winners

Dick Howser Trophy
 Brad Lincoln – 2006

Brooks Wallace Award
 Brad Lincoln – 2006

ABCA/Rawlings National Player of the Year
 Brad Lincoln – 2006

All-Americans

Key

Conference Coach of the Year
The following Houston coaches have been named Conference Coach of the Year while at UH.

Individual Honors

National College Baseball Hall of Fame inductees
The following Houston players and coaches have been enshrined in the National College Baseball Hall of Fame.

Retired numbers
The Cougars have retired three numbers.

No-hitters

See also
List of NCAA Division I baseball programs

References

External links

 

Houston Cougars baseball